The Range Riders is a 1927 American silent Western film directed by Ben F. Wilson and starring Wilson, Neva Gerber, Al Ferguson.

Cast
 Ben F. Wilson as Sra. Shannon 
 Neva Gerber as Betty Grannan
 Al Ferguson as 'Sundown' Sykes
 Ed La Niece as Henry Fellows
 Earl Turner as Capt. Lae 
 Fang the Dog as Pard the Dog

References

Bibliography
 Connelly, Robert B. The Silents: Silent Feature Films, 1910-36, Volume 40, Issue 2. December Press, 1998.
 Munden, Kenneth White. The American Film Institute Catalog of Motion Pictures Produced in the United States, Part 1. University of California Press, 1997.

External links
 

1927 films
1927 Western (genre) films
1920s English-language films
American silent feature films
Silent American Western (genre) films
American black-and-white films
Films directed by Ben F. Wilson
Rayart Pictures films
1920s American films